Rodolfo Olivares (April 19, 1947 – March 17, 2023), known as Fito Olivares, was a Mexican cumbia musician.

Olivares was the son of María Cristina Olivares and Mucio Olivares. He spent his childhood on a ranch of Rechinadores, Tamaulipas.  In the school of this ranch he learned to play the Saxophone that his father bought him. His father Mucio Olivares was a good saxophonist and they started practicing with the saxophone together when he was 12.
He graduated from the commercial academy in 1961 and began to work keeping accounts of some businesses. He began to play professionally in 1963, at the age of 16, in Camargo, Tamaulipas.

Career
With a local group in 1962 he was invited by Abel Martínez, Bernardo Gómez and Noé Santos to be part of the Dueto Estrella in Ciudad Miguel Alemán, Tam. In 1963 he composed his first song "Ya No Eres Mia" that would lead an LP of the Duet Estrella.
In 1979 Fito became part of Tam and Tex and he wrote such songs as "La Otra Musiquera", "Mi Tamaulipeca", and "Flor de Lirio".
Fito Olivares y su Grupo La Pura Sabrosura was born in 1980 in Houston after they released their first album Mi Profesión. It was recorded under the label Gil Records.

His biggest hit, “Juana La Cubana,” was nominated for Lo Nuestro Awards, and his next hit, “El Colesterol,” won an ASCAP award in 1996 for best song in the regional Mexican category.

Olivares had his own recording studio, Japonica Studio, and his own publisher where he recorded his songs, Sabrosura Music.

References

External Links
 

1947 births
2023 deaths
People from Tamaulipas